Kanso (also spelled Qanso, Ganso, Cansu, Qansuh, Anso) is a surname. Notable people with the surname include:
  Al-Ashraf Qansuh Al-Ghuri, Soultan of egypt
 Ali Qanso, Lebanese politician
 Assem Qanso, Lebanese politician
 Nabil Kanso, Lebanese-American painter

Arabic-language surnames